Luper may refer to:

 Luper, Oregon, a stop on the Oregon and California Railroad near Junction City, Oregon
 Luper Cemetery, pioneer cemetery near Junction City, Oregon
 Clara Luper (born 1923), African American activist
 Curtis Luper (born 1966), American football coach
 Kevi Luper (born 1990), American basketball player
 Tulse Luper, fictional ornithologist created by Peter Greenaway
 Zoe Luper, a character from the daytime drama All My Children

See also